Benakal  is a village in the Yelburga taluk of Koppal district in the Indian state of Karnataka.

See also
Hospet
Munirabad
Hampi
Koppal
Karnataka

References

Villages in Koppal district